Belnie is a hamlet  in the civil parish of Gosberton, Lincolnshire, England.

References

Hamlets in Lincolnshire
South Holland, Lincolnshire